Nikos Karageorgiou (born 8 December 1962) is a Greek professional football manager and former player.

Club career
Karageorgiou began his football career at his local village football club Aetos Eratino, before he was transferred to the region's prestigious club Kavala in 1981. He played for his hometown club for 5 years, and was subsequently transferred to PAOK in 1986, where he played for an additional 5 seasons. In 1991, Karageorgiou moved to Panathinaikos, where he won the Greek Cup in 1993, during his last season with the club. He then moved to Skoda Xanthi, where he spent the majority of his career staying at the club until 2000, when he decided to end his playing career and subsequently took over as manager of the club.

International career
Karageorgiou also played 16 international matches with the Greece national football team from 1989 to 1992.

Managerial career
Karageorgiou began his coaching career in Skoda Xanthi during the 1999−2000 season, when he took over as manager of the club replacing Vangelis Vlachos after Matchday 25, while he was still a regular player. During the 2001−02 season, after the resignation of Agentinian manager Juan Ramon Rocha, Karageorgiou, who was initially hired as general manager, was once again appointed head coach of the club, managing to lead Skoda Xanthi to its first ever European campaign, after finishing in 5th place. His tenure with Skoda Xanthi was eventually terminated in the summer of 2004, when he was replaced as head coach of the club by Giannis Matzourakis. In February 2005, he was appointed head coach of PAOK, but his contract was terminated a few months later, in September 2005.

In February 2006, Karageorgiou took over management of Beta Ethniki side Ergotelis, returning the club to its good form and winning the division title. During his tenure at Ergotelis, Karageorgiou enjoyed complete and unconditional support from the club's board of directors. He remained manager of Ergotelis for six straight seasons in the Greek Superleague, thus becoming one of the longest serving managers in competition history, until the end of the 2011−12 season, when the club failed to avoid relegation.

In July 2012, Karageorgiou was appointed head coach of Panetolikos, but was replaced in mid-season. In April 2013 he took over management of Skoda Xanthi for the third time in his career, but was fired in September 2013. Karageorgiou was subsequently hired by fellow Superleague side Levadiakos, but his contract was once again terminated prematurely, in February 2014.

In April 2014, Karageorgiou moved to Cyprus, taking over management of Enosis Neon Paralimni, and led the club to promotion to the Cypriot First Division, after winning the Second Division title. His contract with the club was terminated in November 2015. A month later, in December 2015 Karageorgiou was hired by Greek Superleague club AEL Kalloni. However, as the club was relegated at the end of the season, his contract was terminated on mutual consent.

Managerial statistics

Honours

Player

Panathinaikos
Greek Cup: 1993

Manager

Ergotelis
Beta Ethniki: 2006

Enosis Neon Paralimni
Cypriot Second Division: 2015

References

External links
First for Karageorgiou 17 Feb 2005 The Hellenic Radio (ERA): News in English

1962 births
Living people
Greek footballers
Greek football managers
Kavala F.C. players
PAOK FC players
PAOK FC managers
Panathinaikos F.C. players
Xanthi F.C. players
Super League Greece players
Super League Greece managers
Ergotelis F.C. managers
Xanthi F.C. managers
Panetolikos F.C. managers
Enosis Neon Paralimni FC managers
Expatriate football managers in Cyprus
Al-Shoulla FC managers
Saudi First Division League managers
Expatriate football managers in Saudi Arabia
Association football defenders
Footballers from Kavala
Greece international footballers